Brad Francis is a Canadian racing engineer who has worked with teams such as Richard Childress Racing and Bill Davis Racing. He was inducted into the Canadian Motorsport Hall of Fame in 1995.

Brad Francis has built both cars and engines for a wide range of Canadian racers. Earliest contributions included engines for David Billes. Subsequently, he built the 1980 SCCA Trans-Am winning car # 94 for Eppie Wietzes. That car was completed just in time for the first race and, without turning a wheel except to roll off the trailer, it won its first race. The car was then sold to Peter Deman, who ran it as # 22, 42 and 69, 1982 to 1985.

Brad Francis now works at Roush Racing in Charlotte, North Carolina.

References

Living people
Year of birth missing (living people)